Pop Kaun? is a 2023 Indian Hindi-language comedy-drama streaming series directed by Farhad Samji, produced by Yam Productions and distributed by Disney+ Hotstar. The series stars Kunal Khemu, Saurabh Shukla, Johny Lever, Rajpal Yadav, Ashwini Kalsekar, Chunky Pandey, Jamie Lever, Satish Kaushik, Farhad Samji, Zakir Hussain, Nupur Sanon and Tasha Bhambra.

Cast 
 Kunal Khemu as Sahil Trivedi / Sadiq Qureshi / Sukhwinder Singh (Sukhi) / Sandy Comsalves
 Saurabh Shukla as Karamjeet Biswajeet Chaupala "KBC" 
 Rajpal Yadav as Sultan Qureshi / Taufeeq Qureshi (Double Role)
 Ashwini Kalsekar as Satwant Kaur (Satty)
 Johnny Lever as Brij Kishore Trivedi
 Chunky Panday as Anthony Comsalves
 Satish Kaushik as Dr. Kartar Singh
 Nupur Sanon as Pihu Chaupala
 Farhad Samji as Balwan Trivedi, Sahil's adoptive brother 
 Jamie Lever as Rani
 Zakir Hussain as Mallik, Trivedi's rival
 Tasha Bhambra as Chandu
 Tushar Kapoor as Basheer Badbola

Plot 
The series revolves around the life of Sahil(Kunal Khemu), son of a Brij Kishore Trivedi(Johnny Lever), who is in love with a gangster's daughter Pihu(Nupur Sanon).

Release 
Pop Kaun was released on 17 March 2023 on Disney+ Hotstar.

Soundtrack

}}

Reception 
Vijayalakshmi Narayanan of The Free Press Journal wrote "At the hands of a better writer/director, the premise of promoting religious tolerance through a comedy of errors has tremendous potential. But, when you get the most seasoned actors in the business who have spent lifetimes in entertaining us, you owe everyone a collective apology for wasting their time."

Reviewing for The Indian Express, Sana Farzeen wrote "Not giving any spoilers, but the climax is quite predictable as you figure out where the story is heading. Leave aside a few moments, most of the show is quite forgettable."

Archika Khurana of The Times of India rated the series 2 stars out of 5 and wrote "Kunal Kemmu, who plays the lead, gives an earnest performance but fails to leave an indelible impression. Nupur Sanon (Kriti Sanon's sister) looks promising in her OTT debut, but she is overshadowed by these legendary actors."

Chirag Sehgal of News18 wrote "What has worked wonders for the show is its cast. Kunal Kemmu is brilliant at his job. He has done his role with utmost perfection. He looks very natural in whatever he does."

English Jagran wrote "Farhad Samji, along with his long-time collaborators Tasha Bhambra and Sparsh Khetarpal, wrote the show, and it seems that almost every other line in the series is a recycled SMS forward that would have annoyed people back in 2013. It's now 2023, and the humour is outdated."

Shubham Kulkarni for Koimoi rated 1 star out of 5 and wrote "There is an attempt to show smartness if you observe. The movie repeatedly tried to be a spoof of Anurag Kashyap’s Gangs Of Wasseypur. It names a pivotal part of Sultan Qureshi, makes a character say Faisal’s iconic dialogue."

Russel Olaf D'Silva from PTI News tweeted "#PopKaun: Laugh riot from start to end. Not everyone's cup of tea, but it's slapstick #comedy gold for those who loved the classic ribticklers from #Govinda-#DavidDhawan. With a cast to die for, you have 6 episodes tailormade for family #bingewatching."

Chetana Gautam, a reviewer said "#popkaun on hotstar..it's whacky, its naughty, it's senseless, it's sensitive, it's funny, its brave it's sly, it's a message, it's madness, it's light..not very bright..but still entertaining.. Good cast..easy @kunalkemmu..nice weekend watch."

References 

Disney+ Hotstar original programming
Hindi-language Disney+ Hotstar original programming

External link
 

Hindi-language Disney+ Hotstar original programming
2023 Indian television series debuts
Indian comedy television series
Hindi-language television shows